I-180 may refer to:
 Interstate 180 (disambiguation), one of several roads
 Polikarpov I-180